Paul Rock is British sociologist and criminologist, and is Professor of Social Institutions at the London School of Economics.

He was a founder member of the National Deviancy Conference. Paul Rock has contributed to the field of public criminology. He believes that this field should not be looked away in the eyes of criminologist, however, he does state that public criminology does have flaws. Flaws that may not allow it to "rise" up.

Publications 

Rock, P. ed. (1988), A History of British Criminology, Oxford: Oxford University Press
Rock, P. ed. (1994) The History of Criminology, Aldershot: Dartmouth
Downes, D. & Rock, P. (2003) Understanding Deviance. 4th ed. Oxford: Oxford University Press
Rock, Paul. 2010. “Comment on ‘Public Criminologies.’” Criminology & Public Policy 9 (4): 751–67. doi:10.1111/j.1745-9133.2010.00667.x.

References

External links
Paul Rock's staff page

British sociologists
British criminologists
Living people
Year of birth missing (living people)